Podsiadło is a Polish surname. Notable people with the surname include:

 Dawid Podsiadło (born 1993), Polish singer-songwriter
 Jacek Podsiadło (born 1964), Polish poet, writer, translator, and essayist
 Paweł Podsiadło (born 1986), Polish handball player 

Polish-language surnames